June 27 - Eastern Orthodox Church calendar - June 29

All fixed commemorations below celebrated on July 11 by Orthodox Churches on the Old Calendar.

For June 28th, Orthodox Churches on the Old Calendar commemorate the Saints listed on June 15.

Saints
 Martyrs Plutarch, Serenus, Heraclides, Heron, Rhaïs, Potamiœna and her mother Marcella, at Alexandria, under Septimius Severus (203)
 Hieromartyr Donagus, Bishop of Libya, by fire.	
 Martyr Macedonius.
 The holy Two Children, who were crucified.
 The holy Three Martyrs of Galatia, by the sword.
 The holy 70 Martyrs of Scythopolis, by the sword.
 Venerable Magnus, who reposed while praying to the Lord.
 Venerable Moses the Anchorite.	
 Saint Vulkian, monk.
 Saint Sennuphius the Standard-bearer, of Egypt (late 4th century)  (see also: March 25 )
 Saint Paul the Physician, of Corinth (7th century)
 Saint Sergius the Magistrate, of Paphlagonia, founder of the Nikitiatus Monastery in Nicomedia (866)

Pre-Schism Western saints
 Saint Irenaeus of Lyons, a Greek cleric noted for expanding Christian communities in France, combatting heresy and defining Orthodoxy (202)  (see also August 23 )
 Martyr Pappias (Papius), possibly in Sicily, under Diocletian, by beheading (c. 303)
 Saint Crummin of Lecua (Crummine), a disciple of St Patrick at Leccuine (Lackan) in Westmeath in Ireland (5th century)
 Saint Austell of Cornwall (Austol) (6th century)
 Saint Benignus, Bishop of Utrecht in Holland (6th century)
 Saint Theodichildis (Theodehilda, Telchildis), a nun at Faremoutiers Abbey in France, she became the first Abbess of Jouarre (c. 660)
 Saint Argymirus of Córdoba, martyr (856)
 Saint Egilo (Egilon, Eigil), a monk and later Abbot of Prüm near Trier in Germany (871)
 Saint Heimerad (Heimrad), a priest at Baden in Germany who after many pilgrimages lived as a monk at Hersfeld Abbey and then as a hermit at Hasungen in Westphalia (1019)

Post-Schism Orthodox saints
 Venerable Xenophon of Robeika, founder of Robeika Monastery, Novgorod (1262)
 Saints Sergius and Herman, founders and abbots of Valaam Monastery, Wonderworkers (c. 1353)
 Saint Heliodorus, Schema-Archimandrite of Glinsk Hermitage (1879)

New martyrs and confessors
 New Hieromartyr Basil Sitnikov, Deacon (1918)
 Virgin-martyr Sebastiana Ageyev-Zueva (1938)
 New Hieromartyr Gregory Samarin, Deacon (1940)

Other commemorations
 Translation of the relics (412) of the Holy Wonderworking Unmercenaries and Martyrs Cyrus and John (311)
 Synaxis of the Icon of the Most Holy Theotokos "Of the Three Hands" of Hilandar ("Trojeručica, Tricherousa"), Mount Athos (8th century)  (see also: December 4 )
 Repose of Archimandrite Sophrony (Sakharov) of Essex (1993) (see also: July 11)
 Repose of Archimandrite Methodius (Popovich) of Jerusalem (1997)

Icon gallery

Notes

References

Sources
 June 28/July 11. Orthodox Calendar (PRAVOSLAVIE.RU).
 July 11 / June 28. HOLY TRINITY RUSSIAN ORTHODOX CHURCH (A parish of the Patriarchate of Moscow).
 June 28. OCA - The Lives of the Saints.
 June 28. The Year of Our Salvation - Holy Transfiguration Monastery, Brookline, Massachusetts. 
 The Autonomous Orthodox Metropolia of Western Europe and the Americas (ROCOR). St. Hilarion Calendar of Saints for the year of our Lord 2004. St. Hilarion Press (Austin, TX). pp. 47–48.
 The Twenty-Eighth Day of the Month of June. Orthodoxy in China.
 June 28. Latin Saints of the Orthodox Patriarchate of Rome.
 The Roman Martyrology. Transl. by the Archbishop of Baltimore. Last Edition, According to the Copy Printed at Rome in 1914. Revised Edition, with the Imprimatur of His Eminence Cardinal Gibbons. Baltimore: John Murphy Company, 1916. pp. 187–188.
 Rev. Richard Stanton. A Menology of England and Wales, or, Brief Memorials of the Ancient British and English Saints Arranged According to the Calendar, Together with the Martyrs of the 16th and 17th Centuries. London: Burns & Oates, 1892. pp. 292–293.
Greek Sources
 Great Synaxaristes:  28 ΙΟΥΝΙΟΥ. ΜΕΓΑΣ ΣΥΝΑΞΑΡΙΣΤΗΣ.
  Συναξαριστής. 28 Ιουνίου. ECCLESIA.GR. (H ΕΚΚΛΗΣΙΑ ΤΗΣ ΕΛΛΑΔΟΣ). 
  28 Ιουνίου. Αποστολική Διακονία της Εκκλησίας της Ελλάδος (Apostoliki Diakonia of the Church of Greece).
  28/06/2018. Ορθόδοξος Συναξαριστής. 
Russian Sources
  11 июля (28 июня). Православная Энциклопедия под редакцией Патриарха Московского и всея Руси Кирилла (электронная версия). (Orthodox Encyclopedia - Pravenc.ru).
  28 июня по старому стилю / 11 июля по новому стилю. Русская Православная Церковь - Православный церковный календарь на 2017 год.
  28 июня (ст.ст.) 11 июля 2014 (нов. ст.). Русская Православная Церковь Отдел внешних церковных связей. (DECR).

June in the Eastern Orthodox calendar